L'Indépendant is a regional newspaper from the South of France. It is published daily from its headquarters in Perpignan, and is mainly distributed in the Aude and Pyrénées-Orientales departments. It is owned by the Groupe Sud Ouest media group.

In 2020, the total circulation of L'Indépendant was 40,762 copies.

References

Daily newspapers published in France
Publications established in 1846
1846 establishments in France
Perpignan